Alfred A. Richman (c. 1892 - December 8, 1984) was "an orthopedic surgeon and an honorary trustee of Beth Israel Hospital"
who "founded Manhattan General Hospital in 1928 and was its executive director."

Medical career
Richman graduated from New York Medical College and was a "practicing orthopedic surgeon for a number of years." The rest of his career involved medical facilities:
 a "private sanitarium at 50 West Seventy-fourth Street" (1925-1928)
 136 East 61st Street (1928-1930): a 20-bed facility named Plaza Hospital. Closed.
 161 East 90th Street (1930-1934): Manhattan General Hospital. MGH relocated, and another hospital purchased the building.
 305 Second Avenue (1934-1964): Manhattan General Hospital. acquired by Beth Israel in 1964.

Richman subsequently served Beth Israel "as a trustee and as an administrative consultant."

Tuberculosis
"In 1949, under Dr. Richman's direction, Manhattan General became the first private, nonvoluntary institution in the city to set aside wards for the care of tuberculosis patients." A 1951 journal noted the unit's "multiple and vesatile" treatments.

Family
He was survived by his wife, their three sons and a daughter, "nine grandchildren, and two great-grandchildren" and "three brothers, Hyman, David and Julius, all of Miami Beach."

References

External links
 hospital founding history of Dr. Alfred A. Richman
 Alfred A. Richman Letter to The Editor

American surgeons
New York Medical College alumni
1984 deaths
20th-century American physicians
Year of birth uncertain